Siri Beathe Gellein (born 1 October 1966 in Trondheim, Norway) is a Norwegian Musician (vocals) and journalist, known from several albums, bands and television programs.

Career 
Her own Siri's Svale Band (established in 1987) performs ("sval") cool jazz, with soul. Other band members are John Pål Inderberg (saxophone), Odd Magne Gridseth (bass guitar), Carl Haakon Waadeland (drums), and Bjørn Alterhaug (double bass).  The Quintet released the album Blackbird (1990) and Necessarily So ... (2001) at label Sonor Records. Both gained international fame, particularly due to sonic quality recordings.

On the album Baby Blue – Absolutely live record at Moldejazz (1991) she plays with the guitarist Geir Tosaunet, and had another album release Sånn vil du ha meg (1999), with Bjørn Willadsen Band more into folk music, and lyrics by Inger Hagerup.

Gellein contributed on DumDum Boys album Splitter pine, 1989, participated in the Norwegian Grand Prix semi-finals Melodi Grand Prix 1988 with the tune "Nå" (music composed by Nissa Nyberget, and lyrics by Idar Lind). In the 1990s, she was known as the leader of the program "Sommeråpent" at NRK. I 2002 var hun gjest i "Rundt et Flygel". She has also served on the board of "Trondheim Jazz Festival". She joined the newly established Arbeideravisa December 2007, but left there on 1 June 2008 to work as a freelance journalist and musician.

Discography 
1989: Splitter Pine (CBS), with DumDum Boys
1990: Blackbird (Sonor Records)
1993: Absolutely Live (NAB Records), Trio with Baby Blue (Jostein Strand and Trond Hustad)
1997: Necessarily So... (Sonor Records)
1999: Sånn vil du ha meg (BWM), with Bjørn Villadsen Band (Tore Johansen)
2007: Best of Siri's Svale Band (Mesa Music)

References

External links 
Siri Gellein and BOS on YouTube
Siri's Svale Band Don't Explain on YouTube

Norwegian women jazz singers
Melodi Grand Prix contestants
Norwegian journalists
Musicians from Trondheim
1966 births
Living people
20th-century Norwegian women singers
20th-century Norwegian singers
21st-century Norwegian women singers
21st-century Norwegian singers
Trondheim Voices members
Siri's Svale Band members